Panettiere (a surname meaning "baker") may refer to:

 Hayden Panettiere (born 1989), American actress
 Jansen Panettiere (1994–2023), American actor, brother of Hayden

Occupational surnames
Italian-language surnames